Ulysse Diallo (born 26 October 1992) is a Malian professional footballer who plays for FK Panevėžys in A Lyga.

Club career
Diallo was born in Bamako, Mali.

After impressing for Ferencvárosi TC during a five-week trial, Diallo signed with them on 24 July 2013. After one season with Ferencváros, Diallo had his contract terminated by mutual consent at the beginning of June 2013, going on to sign a two-year contract with F.C. Arouca later in the same month.

In January 2015, Diallo joined Azerbaijan Premier League team Gabala FK on trial.

On 2 February 2015, Diallo signed a six-month-deal with Académica. In late June, Diallo went on trial with Russian Football National League side FC Tosno appearing and scoring on a friendly against Spartak Moscow II.

On 3 July 2015, Diallo signed a three-year-deal with Marítimo.

On 2 August 2019, Diallo signed a two-year contract with Azerbaijan Premier League side Sabah FC.

Club statistics

Honours 
Individual
 Lebanese Premier League Team of the Season: 2012–13

References

External links
 
 MLSZ 
 

1992 births
Living people
Sportspeople from Brazzaville
Malian footballers
Association football forwards
Ferencvárosi TC footballers
F.C. Arouca players
Associação Académica de Coimbra – O.A.F. players
C.S. Marítimo players
Mezőkövesdi SE footballers
Puskás Akadémia FC players
MTK Budapest FC players
Sabah FC (Azerbaijan) players
Primeira Liga players
Nemzeti Bajnokság I players
Azerbaijan Premier League players
Malian expatriate footballers
Expatriate footballers in Lebanon
Expatriate footballers in Hungary
Expatriate footballers in Portugal
Expatriate footballers in Azerbaijan
Malian expatriate sportspeople in Lebanon
Malian expatriate sportspeople in Hungary
Sportspeople from Bamako
Shabab Al Sahel FC players
Lebanese Premier League players
21st-century Malian people